Chiquitita (1979) is Menudo's third Spanish album featuring brothers Carlos, Óscar and Ricky Meléndez 14 13 11, Fernando Sallaberry 14, and new member René Farrait 12. René replaced Nefty Sallaberry after Nefty reached the age limit set by Menudo management.

Track listing
 Ella-a-a (She) (Written by Honorio Herrero, Julio Seijas and Luis Gomez Escobar)
 Sólo Tu Amor (Only Your Love) 
 Doña Tecla -
 Mi Mejor Amiga (My Best Friend) 
 Voy A América (I'm Going To America)  
 Chiquitita (ABBA cover; written by Björn Ulvaeus, Benny Andersson and Buddy McCluksy)
 Sueños (Dreams)
 De Tu Vuelo 
 Soy Natural (I'm Natural) (Written by Edgardo Diaz)
 Voulez-Vous

Vocal notes
On tracks 1 and 8-10, the main vocals are shared by all members of the group. On tracks 2 and 5, the main vocals are provided by René Farrait. Track 3 has main vocals provided by Óscar Meléndez and Ricky Meléndez. Tracks 4 and 6 have main vocals by Fernando Sallaberry. Track 7 features main vocals by Carlos Meléndez; he also has second lead vocal on "Chiquitita".

References

Menudo (band) albums
1979 albums